De Arend (the eagle) was one of the two first steam locomotives in the Netherlands. On 20 September 1839, together with the Snelheid (Dutch for speed), it hauled the first train of the Hollandsche IJzeren Spoorweg-Maatschappij between Amsterdam and Haarlem. It was withdrawn in 1857.

In 1939 a replica of the De Arend was constructed for the 100th anniversary of the Dutch railways. It is displayed at the Nederlands Spoorwegmuseum (Dutch Railway Museum) in Utrecht.

See also 
 Adler (locomotive)

References 

 

 

2-2-2 locomotives
Steam locomotives of the Netherlands
Early steam locomotives
Railway locomotives introduced in 1939

Hollandsche IJzeren Spoorweg-Maatschappij